Brendon Gregory Nash (born March 31, 1987) is a Canadian professional ice hockey player. He is currently under contract to Graz 99ers of the Austrian Hockey League (EBEL). Brendon is the brother of Riley Nash.

Playing career
After completing his collegiate career with Cornell University in the ECAC, on March 30, 2010, he was signed as a free agent by the Montreal Canadiens to a two-year entry-level contract. In the following 2010–11 season, on February 15, 2011, the Canadiens recalled Nash from their AHL affiliate, the Hamilton Bulldogs, for two games.  Nash missed the entire 2011–12 season after undergoing shoulder surgery in September 2011 for an injury suffered in training camp.

On June 29, 2012, the Canadiens announced that Nash had been re-signed to a one-year contract After appearing in 26 games for the Bulldogs in the 2012–13 season, Nash was reassigned by the Canadiens in an AHL trade to the San Antonio Rampage in exchange for Jason DeSantis on January 3, 2013. Upon the agreement of a new NHL CBA, the trade was formalized between the Canadiens and Florida Panthers on January 14, 2013.

On August 20, 2013, Nash failed to receive an NHL offer as a free agent, and signed to a one-year AHL contract with the Hartford Wolf Pack.

After spending the 2014–15 season in the ECHL with the Bakersfield Condors on July 25, 2015, Nash signed a one-year deal with European team Rytíři Kladno of the Czech First league, which is owned by Jaromír Jágr. During the 2015–16 season with Kladno, Nash dominated offensively from the blueline contributing with 43 points from 48 games.

On July 4, 2016, Nash continued his European career, in moving to Austria on a one-year deal with Graz 99ers of the EBEL.

Career statistics

Awards and honours

References

External links

1987 births
Living people
Bakersfield Condors (1998–2015) players
Charlotte Checkers (2010–) players
Cornell Big Red men's ice hockey players
Graz 99ers players
Hamilton Bulldogs (AHL) players
Hartford Wolf Pack players
Rytíři Kladno players
Sportspeople from Kamloops
Montreal Canadiens players
San Antonio Rampage players
Ice hockey people from British Columbia
Undrafted National Hockey League players
Canadian ice hockey defencemen
Canadian expatriate ice hockey players in the Czech Republic
Canadian expatriate ice hockey players in Austria

AHCA Division I men's ice hockey All-Americans
Canadian expatriate ice hockey players in the United States
Canadian expatriate ice hockey players in Denmark